The Dikko affair was a joint Nigerian-Israeli attempt to kidnap Umaru Dikko, a former Nigerian civilian government minister living in the United Kingdom, in 1984, and secretly transport him back to Nigeria in a diplomatic bag. The kidnapping took place, but the transportation was unsuccessful. After it was foiled, the political fallout seriously damaged relations between Nigeria and the United Kingdom for years.

Background
Dikko was an influential Transport Minister in the civilian administration of President Shehu Shagari, his brother-in-law. In 1983, the Nigerian government was overthrown in a military coup led by Major-General Muhammadu Buhari, and a new military government led by Buhari was established. On his second day in power, Buhari issued a list of former government officials accused of a variety of crimes. Dikko, who topped the list, was accused of embezzling several billion US dollars (sources claim that the amount was around 6 billion US dollars) in oil profits from the national treasury. Dikko fled to Britain, settled in London, and became a vocal critic of the regime in exile.

Though Israel, at the time, did not have formal diplomatic relations with Nigeria, there were less visible ties between the two nations. In particular, Nigeria was an important source of oil for Israel, and Israel was a significant supplier of arms to Nigeria. The Israeli intelligence agency Mossad was tasked with locating Dikko and bringing him back to Nigeria to stand trial.

The kidnapping
Mossad sources across Europe failed to locate Dikko. However, Mossad Director-General Nahum Admoni decided that Dikko was probably in London, which had become a haven for Nigerian exiles critical of the new regime. Mossad field officers (katsas), accompanied by Nigerian security service agents led by ex-Nigerian Army Major Mohammed Yusufu, traveled to London. The Nigerian team rented an apartment on Cromwell Road and posed as refugees from the new regime. The Mossad agents rented rooms in hotels catering to tourists from Africa, and posed as anti-apartheid activists. Working separately, the two teams moved among the Nigerian expat community in London, gradually narrowing their search to West London, to the area around Hyde Park, where many wealthy Nigerian exiles lived. They combed the electoral registers freely available in the area's town halls, but found no trace of Dikko.

On 30 June 1984, a Mossad agent driving down Queensway, in Bayswater, spotted Dikko. He parked his car and then tailed Dikko on foot to his house in Porchester Terrace. Admoni was immediately informed, and ordered surveillance on the house. From then on, the house was constantly watched, while the Nigerians, using their London high commission as a base, prepared a kidnapping operation. Meanwhile, Mossad recruited Levi-Arie Shapiro, an Israeli doctor who was a consultant anesthetist and director of the intensive care unit at HaSharon Hospital. He was to fly to London and participate in the operation. Shapiro's job would be to drug Dikko, and insert an endotracheal tube to keep him from choking on his own vomit while being transported in a crate.

Late in the evening of 3 July 1984, a Nigeria Airways Boeing 707 arrived at Stansted Airport from Lagos. The aircraft had arrived empty, and the pilot notified the authorities that the plane had arrived to pick up diplomatic baggage from the Nigerian high commission. On board were several Nigerian security guards, who openly identified themselves as such and stated that they were there to protect the baggage. Their presence was reported to Scotland Yard's Special Branch. The following day, Dikko was kidnapped in front of his home while he was out for a walk and taken away in a van driven by Yusufu. He was then drugged into unconsciousness by Shapiro. However, the abduction was witnessed by Dikko's secretary, Elizabeth Hayes, who quickly notified the authorities.

Dikko and Shapiro were placed in one crate of 1.2 × 1.2 × 1.6 metres in size, while Mossad agents Alexander Barak and Felix Abithol occupied a second. However, proper documentation that would have ensured that the cargo could not be inspected was not provided. The crates were also not labeled as diplomatic bags, as required by Article 27(4) of the 1961 Vienna Convention on Diplomatic Relations. As a result, customs officials who had received an all-ports warning alerting them to the kidnapping while the crates were being processed at the airport were able to open the crates without violating the convention and foil the kidnapping. Dikko was taken to a hospital; he was uninjured.

Seventeen men were arrested; four were convicted and sentenced to prison terms of 10 to 14 years: Shapiro, Barak, Abithol, and Yusufu. All four were released after serving between six and eight and a half years, and were quietly deported. In retaliation, two British engineers in Nigeria were arrested and given fourteen-year prison sentences for allegedly stealing a private jet. The two British engineers had their charges overturned and were released after serving 25 months.

Repercussions
The Nigerian and Israeli governments never admitted any connection to the incident. Nonetheless, the British government immediately expelled two members of the Nigerian High Commission in London, including the High Commissioner. Diplomatic relations with Nigeria were broken off for two years. The CEO of Nigeria Airways was at one point almost arrested by British police. In the aftermath of the affair, Nigeria filed a formal extradition request for Dikko, but it was refused. The Nigerian government's war against the previous government's corruption was also weakened, as the British government also rejected Nigerian requests to extradite other politicians wanted in Nigeria on corruption charges and living in exile in Britain.

Dikko was eventually asked to return to Nigeria. He accepted the invitation and set up a political party, the Solidarity Group of Nigeria (SGN).

References

Diplomatic incidents
Espionage scandals and incidents
1984 in the United Kingdom
Nigeria–United Kingdom relations
Kidnappings in the United Kingdom
Mossad operations